Toni Tapalović (born 10 October 1980) is a German former professional footballer who played as a goalkeeper, and was the goalkeeping coach of Bayern Munich.

Club career
Throughout his career he played for lower clubs or for the reserve teams. Tapalovic began his career in 1986 at Fortuna Gelsenkirchen. In 1990, he moved to the youth squad of FC Schalke 04. In 1999, he was promoted to the "A" youth and amateur team. He later received a professional contract for two years, lasting until 2001, but withdrew in August 1999 because of a knee injury in the inner meniscus. In 2002, he moved to VfL Bochum, where he was under contract until January 2004. In both teams he played for in the Bundesliga, he was a substitute goalkeeper without Bundesliga match practice. In January 2004, he joined the KFC Uerdingen 05 in the Regionalliga West. He played there until June 2005. During his time at KFC Uerdingen 05 he made 26 appearances for the team.

In December 2005, Tapalovic joined the then second division side Kickers Offenbach, but did not play. In 2006, he returned to FC Schalke 04. After the departure of Frank Rost in January 2007, Tapalovic was again the substitute goalkeeper for the team. In 2010, he joined the German Bundesliga team FSV Mainz 05's second team. In October 2010, Tapalovic retired after a test confirmed a torn ACL and a tear of the medial collateral ligament which would force him to be out for six months.

Coaching career
On 1 July 2011, he was appointed as the goalkeeping coach of Bayern Munich. He has a contract with Bayern Munich till 30 June 2021. He later extended his contract until 2023, due to success of working with Manuel Neuer. On 23 January 2023, he was released from his duties at Bayern due to differences about the way of working with other staff members, according to sporting director Hasan Salihamidžić.

Personal life
His brother Filip Tapalović is also a former footballer who played for Croatia national team.

References

1980 births
Sportspeople from Gelsenkirchen
FC Schalke 04 II players
FC Schalke 04 players
VfL Bochum II players
Living people
German people of Croatian descent
Association football goalkeepers
Footballers from North Rhine-Westphalia
German footballers
FC Bayern Munich non-playing staff
Association football goalkeeping coaches
1. FSV Mainz 05 II players
KFC Uerdingen 05 players
Regionalliga players
Kickers Offenbach players